Zach Osborne (born September 25, 1989) is an American former professional motocross, supercross and enduro racer. He currently works as a television sports commentator. He competed in the AMA Motocross Championships from 2006 to 2007 and in the Motocross World Championships from 2008 to 2012, before returning to compete in the AMA Motocross Championships from 2013 to 2022. Osborne is notable for winning two AMA motocross national championships and, has represented the United States as a member of American teams at the Motocross des Nations, as well as in the International Six Days Enduro.

Osborne is currently a rotating trackside reporter for Supercross races on NBC Sports.

Motocross career
Osborne was born in Abingdon, Virginia. Being exposed to motocross at a young age, he received his first motorcycle at the age of three. He started his amateur racing career with KTM at age 6 and quickly progressed into the amateur nationals. He began his professional career as a privateer in 2006 before going to Red Bull KTM in 2007 and then Yamaha of Troy. After four seasons competing in the Motocross World Championships in Europe, he returned to the AMA Motocross Championships in 2013 as a member of the Geico Honda racing team. He switched to join the RockStar Husqvarna racing team in 2015.

He has competed in every major global championship and the world’s most prestigious enduro competition. He was 2010 British Motocross Champion MX2 and 2013 US Trophy Team member at the International Six Days Enduro (ISDE).

Osborne won the 2017 250SX Eastern Regional supercross championship. The following season he successfully defended his 250SX Eastern Regional title. He was the 2017 AMA 250MX Champion and the 2020 AMA 450MX Champion.

He led the US team in the 2019 Motocross des Nations.

He has trained alongside notable riders such as Cooper Webb and Jason Anderson under the stewardship of professional motocross trainer Aldon Baker.

References

Living people
People from Abingdon, Virginia
American motocross riders
Enduro riders
AMA Motocross Championship National Champions
1990 births